Nester House, also known as the Family Grocerie, Union Hotel, and Riverplace, is a historic hotel located at Troy, Perry County, Indiana.  It was built about 1863, and is a -story, sandstone block building, with a late 1870s or mid 1880s rear addition.  It features a two tiered, full facade porch. Also on the property is a contributing one story, rectangular brick building that is believed to have been a bathhouse for the hotel.  The building housed a hotel that served salesmen and other river travelers of late-19th and early-20th century.  It ceased to be used as a hotel in the 1930s.

It was listed on the National Register of Historic Places in 1990.

References

Hotel buildings on the National Register of Historic Places in Indiana
Hotel buildings completed in 1863
Buildings and structures in Perry County, Indiana
National Register of Historic Places in Perry County, Indiana